Christopher Hatz (born 21 October 1991) is a German racing cyclist, who currently rides for German amateur team Radsport-Team Lutz.

Major results
2013
 8th Eschborn–Frankfurt Under–23
2014
 1st  Overall Bałtyk–Karkonosze Tour
2015
 6th Overall Course de Solidarność et des Champions Olympiques
2016
 8th Grand Prix de la Somme
2017
 3rd Rund um Düren
2018
 5th White Spot / Delta Road Race
2019
 4th Poreč Trophy
 7th Overall Tour of Mersin
 9th Overall Belgrade Banjaluka
 10th Time trial, European Games

References

External links

1991 births
Living people
German male cyclists
People from Achern
Sportspeople from Freiburg (region)
European Games competitors for Germany
Cyclists at the 2019 European Games
Cyclists from Baden-Württemberg